The 1901 Glamorgan County Council election was the fifth contest for seats on this authority in south Wales. It was preceded by the 1898 election and followed by the 1904 election. Glamorgan was by far the largest county in Wales in terms of population. Glamorgan County Council had been established by the Local Government Act 1888, the first elections being held in early 1889.

Overview of the result
As in most parts of Wales, the Liberal Party was once again triumphant and won a majority of the seats. In 1901 the majority of the seats were uncontested, in contrast to the position at previous elections.

Results are drawn from a number of sources. They include a number of newspapers.

Boundary changes
There were no boundary changes at this election.

Retiring aldermen
Eight of the eleven retiring aldermen were Liberals.

Results

Aberaman

Aberavon

Aberdare Town
David Price Davies, a member of the Council since 1889 and an alderman from 1892 until 1898 was defeated.

Barry

Blaengwawr

Cadoxton

Bridgend

Briton Ferry
Jenkin Hill recaptured the seat he lost three years previously.

Caeharris

Caerphilly

Cilfynydd

Coedffranc

Coity

Cowbridge

Cwmavon
Two Liberals, a sitting alderman and sitting councillor, opposed each other.

Cyfarthfa
Thomas Thomas recaptured the seat he lost three years previously.

Cymmer

Dinas Powys

Dowlais

Dulais Valley

Ferndale
Three candidates were nominated to contest the vacancy left by the former member, Rev Silas Charles, who had moved to Cardiff.

Gadlys
Charles Kenshole, elected unopposed in 1898 was defeated.

Garw Valley

Gellifaelog

Gelligaer

Gower

Kibbor

Llandaff

Llandeilo Talybont

Llansamlet

Llantrisant

Llwydcoed
Rees Llewellyn, prominent industrialist and member of Aberdare Urban District Council won the seat.

Llwynypia and Clydach

Lougher and Penderry

Maesteg
The same two candidates had faced each other in 1895. On that occasion, Barrow had won and was elected as alderman for a three-year period. Jenkin Jones was then returned at a by-election.

Margam
The previous councillor, Edward Knox, was said to have left the district. D.R. David was the owner of the Taibach Tinplate Works and a prominent figure in the public life of the district.

Merthyr Town

Merthyr Vale

Morriston

Mountain Ash

Neath (North)

Neath (South)
At the previous election, Trick had stood as a Conservative.

Newcastle

Ogmore

Ogmore Valley

Oystermouth

Penarth North

Penarth South

Penrhiwceiber

Pentre
Morris appears to have defected to the Unionists, leading to his defeat.

Penydarren

Pontardawe

Plymouth

Pontlottyn
Although a Liberal gain, the shock was the defeat of Alderman Aaron Davies.

Pontypridd

Porth and Penygraig

Resolven

Sketty
John Davies had been defeated in the two previous elections but was now returned unopposed.

Clydach

Treforest
James Roberts had won the seat at a by-election following the death of the previous member, David Leyshon

Treherbert

Treorchy

Trealaw and Tonypandy

Tylorstown and Ynyshir

Ystalyfera

Ystrad

Election of aldermen

In addition to the 66 councillors the council consisted of 22 county aldermen. Aldermen were elected by the council, and served a six-year term. Following the 1901 election, there were eleven Aldermanic vacancies.

The following aldermen were appointed by the newly elected council. A notable feature was the non-election of Sir John Llewelyn, an alderman since 1889. As a result, there were no Conservative aldermen on Glamorgan County Council, the first time that this had occurred.

elected for six years
Richard Lewis, Liberal  (elected councillor at Llwynypia and Clydach)
Walter H. Morgan, Liberal, retiring alderman (elected councillor at Pontypridd)
John Jones Griffiths, Liberal, retiring alderman (elected councillor at Porth)
William Morgan, Liberal, retiring alderman (elected councillor at Treherbert)
Thomas Williams
John Thomas, Liberal-Labour (elected councillor at Garw Valley)
Morgan Williams, Liberal, Ynyshir
Edward Edwards, Liberal, Nelson
Thomas Thomas, Liberal, Merthyr
Thomas Jones, Liberal, Swansea Valley
Jenkin Hill, Liberal (elected councillor at Briton Ferry)

References

Bibliography

1901
1901 Welsh local elections